Farewell to Revolution: Looking Back Upon China of the Twentieth Century is a book written by Chinese philosopher Li Zehou and Liu Zaifu, and published by Cosmos Books Ltd. in Hong Kong.

Li and Liu argue in this book that class conflict will always exist, and should be solved via class reconciliation rather than class struggle, and thus oppose orthodox Marxism. Li and Liu advocate "reform rather than revolution" and claim that the revolution has been "screwed up". They say that if China had followed the path of Kang Youwei and Liang Qichao's constitutional reform, China might have gotten better results; and propose the "four-stage agenda" of China's modernization as development of economy, individual liberty, social justice, and democracy. Despite being questioned about their opposition to all revolutions, in a series of subsequent interviews they expressed their opposition only to the "violent French type revolution" and their support for the "glorious British type revolution".

The book has been highly controversial since its publication. Many scholars have described Li's views in the book as "cultural conservatism" or "neoconservatism". Chinese officials and some scholars have even called Li's claims in the book "historical nihilism".

References 

1995 non-fiction books
Books about the Cultural Revolution
Books about politics of China
Conservatism in China